Nego may refer to:

 Nego (historian) (1921-1993), Ion Negoițescu, Romanian literary historian
 Erica Nego (born 1984), Ghanaian beauty queen and model
 Nêgo (footballer) (born 1985), Lindenbergh Francisco da Silva, Brazilian footballer
 Loïc Négo (born 1991), Hungarian footballer
 Nego do Borel (born 1992), Leno Maycon Viana Gomes, Brazilian funk musician